Franziska Peer (born 6 May 1987) is an Austrian sport shooter.

She participated at the 2018 ISSF World Shooting Championships, winning a medal.

References

External links
 

1987 births
Living people
Austrian female sport shooters
ISSF rifle shooters
People from Kufstein
European Games silver medalists for Austria
Shooters at the 2019 European Games
European Games medalists in shooting
Sportspeople from Tyrol (state)
20th-century Austrian women
21st-century Austrian women